BlogPulse was a search engine and analytic system for blogs. It uses automated processes to monitor the daily activity on blogs and generates trend information. It was initially created by IntelliSeek, and was later acquired by the Nielsen Company, and currently owned by NM Incite, A Nielsen / McKinsey & Company.

As of January 2012, BlogPulse is no longer available.

Features
BlogPulse permits searching of the past six months of blog posts. Beyond the searching, there are some useful tools here:
Trend search - generate a buzz trend chart for up to three such groups of query terms
Conversation tracker - create a threaded conversation graph for any topic or blog post to see how the buzz spread through blogs for that topic 
Blog profiles - in-depth data about the top blogs, analysis of their blog presence, activity, and influence
Real-time buzz - seen on the home page, provides an up to the minute view of the buzz trend across major categories 
Daily analytics - top links, top blogs, top videos, top news stories, key people, top blog posts, key phrases, top news sources all updated daily 
Highlights - curated trends in buzz, updated daily

Benefits
As a blog search engine, BlogPulse can be used to do a search of just blog posts. Bloggers can ensure their posts are being indexed and find out how they rank against other bloggers. Public relations or media relations practitioners can use BlogPulse to learn about the buzz around any brand or company they represent. It is also an effective research to find out what trends people are paying attention to.

See also
 Technorati
 BlogScope
 Google Blog Search

External links 
 BlogPulse Website
 Nielsen BuzzMetrics Finalizes Intelliseek Acquisition
 Nielsen BuzzMetrics website

References

Blog search engines
Defunct internet search engines